In chemistry, an electron donor is a chemical entity that donates electrons to another compound. It is a reducing agent that, by virtue of its donating electrons, is itself oxidized in the process.

Typical reducing agents undergo permanent chemical alteration through covalent or ionic reaction chemistry. This results in the complete and irreversible transfer of one or more electrons. In many chemical circumstances, however, the transfer of electronic charge to an electron acceptor may be only fractional, meaning an electron is not completely transferred, but results in an electron resonance between the donor and acceptor. This leads to the formation of charge transfer complexes in which the components largely retain their chemical identities.

The electron donating power of a donor molecule is measured by its ionization potential which is the energy required to remove an electron from the highest occupied molecular orbital (HOMO).

The overall energy balance (ΔE), i.e., energy gained or lost, in an electron donor-acceptor transfer is determined by the difference between the acceptor's electron affinity (A) and the ionization potential (I):

The class of electron donors that donate not just one, but a set of two paired electrons that form a covalent bond with an electron acceptor molecule, is known as a Lewis base. This phenomenon gives rise to the wide field of Lewis acid-base chemistry. The driving forces for electron donor and acceptor behavior in chemistry is based on the concepts of electropositivity (for donors) and electronegativity (for acceptors) of atomic or molecular entities.

In biology 

In biology, electron donors release an electron during cellular respiration, resulting in the release of energy. Microorganisms, such as bacteria, obtain energy in electron transfer processes. Through its cellular machinery, the microorganism collects the energy for its use. The final result of this process (electron transport chain) is that the electron is donated to an electron acceptor. Petroleum hydrocarbons, less chlorinated solvents like vinyl chloride, soil organic matter, and reduced inorganic compounds are all compounds that can act as electron donors. These reactions are of interest not only because they allow organisms to obtain energy, but also because they are involved in the natural biodegradation of organic contaminants. When clean-up professionals use monitored natural attenuation to clean up contaminated sites, biodegradation is one of the major contributing processes. Vitamin C is an important electron donor, which is why it is considered a potent water-soluble antioxidant with antiviral properties in humans.

See also
Semiconductor
Donor (semiconductors)

References

External links
Electron donor definition at United States Geological Survey

Electrochemical concepts

ru:Донор (физика)